Kaiser Permanente Arena is an indoor arena located in Santa Cruz, in the U.S. state of California. It has a seating capacity of 2,505 spectators. It hosts the Santa Cruz Warriors of the NBA G League. It was also the home of the Santa Cruz Derby Girls  of the Women's Flat Track Derby Association in 2013 and 2014. The naming rights were bought by health care consortium Kaiser Permanente (KP) despite the company—a sponsor of the Warriors' owner, the NBA's Golden State Warriors—not having facilities in Santa Cruz at the time. KP has since opened medical facilities in Santa Cruz, Scotts Valley and Watsonville.

History
A $3.5 million loan by the city of Santa Cruz was given to the Warriors to build their arena, with the 1.5-acre lot being provided by the Santa Cruz Seaside Company, owner of the Santa Cruz Beach Boardwalk. Construction ran for 78 days between September and December 2012, halted just a few times by rain. The arena was opened on December 23, 2012, with a victory by the Warriors against the Bakersfield Jam. 

By April 2014, Kaiser Permanente Arena had 39 sell-outs out of the 53 Warriors home games. In the meantime, the Warriors reached two D-League finals. The arena has a seating capacity of 2,505.

The arena also serves as the home of UC Santa Cruz men's and women's basketball games. In November 2017, UC Santa Cruz hosted a Thanksgiving basketball tournament at Kaiser Permanente Arena.

The United States men's national basketball team hosted their FIBA World Cup qualifying first-round games at Kaiser Permanente Arena on February 23, 2018, against Cuba and on February 26, 2018, against Puerto Rico.

Due to COVID restrictions on games in Santa Clara County, the Stanford men's and Stanford women's basketball teams played some games of the 2020–21  season at the arena. 

The arena was used by Kaiser Permanente as a vaccination hub to distribute COVID-19 vaccines in 2021.

In 2022, the Sea Dubs broke their franchise record, selling out over 100 straight games at KP Arena.

See also
Jenny Craig Pavilion
McKeon Pavilion
UCLA Health Training Center
Toyota Arena

References

External links
Arena Information — Santa Cruz Warriors via santacruz.gleague.nba.com
Kaiser Permanente Arena via ArenaDigest.com

Indoor arenas in California
NBA G League venues
Santa Cruz Warriors
2012 establishments in California
Sports venues completed in 2012
Basketball venues in California
Santa Cruz, California
College basketball venues in the United States